Michael Platt (born 23 March 1984) is a former Ireland international rugby league footballer who played for the Salford Red Devils; he joined the Salford Red Devils in April 2014 and is contacted until the end of the 2014 season following a successful trial with the Superleague club. Michael joined the Red Devils following 3 appearances with the North Wales Crusaders in 2014. Platt's 1st choice position is Full Back but he has been more effective at Centre for the Bradford Bulls winning the 'Rugby League World Centre of the Month' for August.

Background
Platt was born in Manchester, England.

Early career
Platt started his career at the Salford City Reds, making his début in the Super League against the Wakefield Trinity Wildcats in the final game of the 2001 season at just 17. However he never quite made the grade and was released by the club.

Michael then signed for the Rochdale Hornets. His impressive début season was somewhat blighted by a broken jaw, although he did go on to win the National League's Young Player of the Year award in 2004.

Castleford Tigers
Michael then joined the Castleford Tigers (Heritage № 820), and helped the Tigers gain promotion in 2005. Despite the subsequent Super League season proving to be difficult in a squad which lacked quality, Platt still managed to score 7 tries. However, after a heart-breaking 29–17 defeat against Wakefield in the final game of the season, Castleford were relegated.

Bradford Bulls
Platt joined the Bradford Bulls in 2007 after a dispute between Platt and Castleford over his availability. His first season started well and he topped the try-scorers league for a number of weeks at the start of the season. He extended his contract in 2011 for a further 2 years, meaning he will stay with the Bulls until at least 2013.

Return to hometown club
On 18 April 2014, Salford head coach, and former Bradford Bulls team-mate, Iestyn Harris signed up Michael to play for the Red Devils for the remainder of the 2014 season.

International
Platt is an Irish international. He was overlooked by Tony Smith for Great Britain and this has been seen to be due to his allegiance to Ireland for the World Cup 2008 in Australia, and the continuing outstanding form of Paul Wellens. However he was called up for the Great Britain Squad for the 2007 test series with New Zealand, and played at full back for the prestigious Northern Union game against All Golds in a centenary match.

He was named in the Ireland training squad for the 2008 Rugby League World Cup, and the Ireland squad for the 2008 Rugby League World Cup.

In October 2014, Platt played in the European Cup competition.

References

External links
Bradford Bulls profile
Ireland profile
Super League profile
Castleford Tigers profile
Platt hits bull's-eye with transfer to Bradford
Platt shows what Reds are missing
Platt shows the way as Bulls take the spoils

1984 births
Living people
Barrow Raiders players
Bradford Bulls players
Castleford Tigers players
Dewsbury Rams players
English people of Irish descent
Ireland national rugby league team players
Leigh Leopards players
North Wales Crusaders players
Rochdale Hornets players
Rugby league fullbacks
Rugby league players from Manchester
Salford Red Devils players